Line D of the Buenos Aires Underground runs from Catedral to Congreso de Tucumán. The line opened on 3 June 1937 and has been expanded to the north several times. The line is currently  11 km long and has 16 stations, while running approximately parallel to the city's coastline.

History

Line D was the second line to be built by the Compañía Hispano Argentina de Obras Públicas y Finanzas (CHADOPyF, Hispanic-Argentine Company for Public Works and Finances), following the construction of Line C in 1934. Construction began in 1935 and the first part of the line was inaugurated in 1937 and ran 1.7 km from Catedral (still the current terminus) to Tribunales. Three years later, the section which brought the line to Plaza Italia in Palermo was completed, bringing the length of the line to 6.5 km.

The line was not properly extended until 1993 when it was extended to Ministro Caranza, a station named after the Radical politician. Further extensions occurred in the 1990s, beginning in 1997 with the opening of Olleros and José Hernández, then Juramento in 1999, and finally Congreso de Tucumán in 2000, where it currently terminates.

Over the decades it has been discussed numerous times whether to extend the line out to the limits of the city proper. The last of these proposals came forward in 2002 which would have seen an additional two stations added to the line. However, this was later abandoned since the line was already at full capacity after the opening of Congreso de Tucumán station. In June 2015 the Metrobus Cabildo line opened, connecting Line D from its terminus at Congreso de Tucumán to Vicente López district in Greater Buenos Aires, some kilometres away from the city limits, essentially making the extension of Line D redundant. Line D is the only line in the network which will not be extended as part of the most recent expansion plan.

Until the privatisation of the underground in the 1990s, Line D was identified by the red colour; whilst Line B used green.

Museum Stations

Cultural activities occur at the Line D Juramento, Congreso de Tucumán and Olleros stations. These stations can be visited to see the exhibitions provided by the city's and national museums, education institutions and other civil society organisations.

“The objective of the museum-stations is to get the population acquainted with the huge cultural and historical patrimony that the City owns, thus turning the subway network, a massive transport medium, into an ideal diffusion agent. The lending of the facilities is absolutely free for the museum and institutions that wish to exhibit their activities or part of the historical or cultural patrimony they treasure”.

Rolling stock

Line D was originally served by Siemens-Schuckert Orenstein & Koppel rail rolling stock, and then by CAF cars. In 1999, cars from the Nagoya Municipal Subway were purchased second hand from Japan and used on  the line. In 2001, numerous Alstom Metropolis 100 Series cars were purchased and built in Brazil and Argentina with the intention of incorporating them into Line A, however they were ultimately put into service on Line D where they remain to this day. More 100 Series cars were purchased up until 2009, making a total of 96 cars.

The remaining Nagoya cars were moved to Line C in 2007 and replaced with the 100 Series cars and with Fiat-Materfer cars. To make the rolling stock more uniform, 24 more modern 300 Series Alstom Metropolis cars were ordered in 2013 to replace the Materfer cars on the line, which meant that the line was entirely composed of 120 Alstom cars. In September 2015, at a conference in Brazil, the head of SBASE gave a presentation in which the number of new cars to be purchased for the line was 84 instead of 30. By 2016, the final figure had been fixed at 60 new cars, which meant that the was composed of 156 Alstom Metropolis cars by 2017.

Gallery

References

External links 

 Subterráneos de Buenos Aires (Official Page)
 Metrovías S.A. Subte Operator (Official Page)
 Subterráneos de Buenos Aires, D Line
 System map

Buenos Aires Underground
Railway lines opened in 1937
Buenos Aires – Line D
1937 establishments in Argentina